Ujjal Bhuyan (born 2 August 1964) is an Indian judge. Presently, he is Chief Justice of Telangana High Court. He has also served as Judge of Telangana High Court, Bombay High Court and Gauhati High Court.

Career 
Bhuyan was born on 2 August 1964 at Guwahati. He did his schooling in Don Bosco High School, Guwahati, and studied in Cotton College, Guwahati. He obtained his L.L.B degree from Government Law College in Guwahati and his L.L.M degree from Gauhati University. On 20 March 1991, he was enrolled with the Bar Council of Assam, Nagaland, Meghalaya, Manipur, Tripura, Mizoram and Arunachal Pradesh. On 6 September 2010, he was designated as Senior Advocate by Gauhati High Court. He was appointed as Additional Advocate General, Assam on 21 July 2011. He was elevated as an Additional Judge of the Gauhati High Court on 17 October 2011 and made a permanent judge on 20 March 2013. He was transferred as a Judge of Bombay High Court on 3 October 2019. He was transferred as a Judge of Telangana High Court on 22 October 2021. He was elevated as Chief Justice of Telangana High Court on 28 June 2022.

References 

Indian judges
1964 births
Living people